AM-411 (part of the AM cannabinoid series) is an analgesic drug that is a cannabinoid agonist. It is a derivative of Δ8-THC substituted with an adamantyl group at the 3-position, demonstrating that the binding pocket for the alkyl chain at this position can accommodate significant bulk.

AM-411 is a potent and fairly selective CB1 full agonist with a Ki of 6.80 nM, but is still also a moderately potent CB2 agonist with a Ki of 52.0 nM. It produces similar effects to other cannabinoid agonists such as analgesia, sedation, and anxiolysis.

See also 
 AM-087
 AM-1248
 KM-233

References 

Adamantanes
Benzochromenes
Phenols
AM cannabinoids